The Jubilee Bridge is a former rail bridge over the Hooghly River between Naihati and Bandel in West Bengal, India. It provided an important connection between Garifa railway station and Hooghly Ghat railway station.

The Jubilee Bridge was opened on 16 February 1885 in the fiftieth, or golden jubilee, year of the reign of Queen Victoria. Construction began in 1882 and was completed in 1887. The Chief Engineer in charge of construction works was Lt Col Arthur John Barry, nephew of Sir John Wolfe-Barry, project engineer of the London Tower Bridge. The Bridge was designed by Sir Bradford Leslie, Chief Engineer in India and Alexander Meadows Rendel. Its steel was manufactured by Hawks Crawshay of Gateshead in England and James Goodwin of Motherwell in Scotland. Bradford Leslie also designed the floating pontoon bridge across the Hooghly in Calcutta, which was replaced by the Howrah Bridge in 1942 and the Gorai River Railway Bridge near Kushtia in Bangladesh. He was a son of the American painter Charles Robert Leslie, ultimately Professor of Painting at the Royal Academy in London.

The Jubilee Bridge is noteworthy in that it is a cantilever truss bridge, constructed entirely by riveting, without any nuts or bolts used in the construction.

Replacement and retirement 
The Jubilee Bridge was decommissioned from service on 17 April 2016, the last train to pass through it being 13141/Teesta Torsha Express. At the same time rail traffic was diverted through Sampreeti Bridge, the new bridge between Bandel and Naihati section of the Eastern Railway, that has been constructed beside the Jubilee Bridge.

Jubilee bridge served the people for 129 years, and several generations used the service to cross the River Hooghly. The bridge has the distinction of being first permanent crossing over the Hooghly, which had been considered unbridgeable owing to difficult foundation conditions at that time.

The new bridge, Sampreeti Bridge, was inaugurated in 2016 after work started on around 2004. It is the first continuous truss bridge in India.

References

External links 
 India Railways Fan Club gallery

Railway bridges in India
Bridges in West Bengal
Buildings and structures in Hooghly district
North 24 Parganas district
Bridges completed in 1885
1885 establishments in India
2016 disestablishments in India
Railway bridges in West Bengal